The Hub, officially the New Jersey Innovation and Technology Hub, is a research, business incubator and innovation center under construction in New Brunswick, New Jersey, which itself is called The Hub City.

Site and construction
The Hub is across the street from the New Brunswick station, served by NJ Transit's Northeast Corridor Line and several Amtrak trains. The site was formerly the Ferren Mall, which opened in 1982, was later abandoned and demolished in 2017. Ground was broken for Phase 1 of the $650 million project in October 2021. It includes a 13-story building with retail space on the first floors. It is  expected to be completed in 2024.

Stakeholders and tenants
The New Jersey Economic Development Authority and the New Brunswick Development Corporation (DEVCO) are partners in the project. Part of the project will be dedicated to translational research. Tenants will include: Officials believe a chip manugacturer could be a potential tenant.

Rutgers' Robert Wood Johnson Medical School
Princeton University
Atlantic Technological University
Choose New Jersey
Hackensack Meridian Health
RWJBarnabas Health

See also
List of tallest buildings in New Brunswick
The Gateway (New Brunswick, New Jersey)

References

External links 
DEVCO The Hub
The Hub

Early designs 2104

Buildings and structures in New Brunswick, New Jersey
Skyscrapers in New Jersey
Office buildings in New Jersey
Rutgers University buildings